New Technology Train (NTT) is the collective term for the modern passenger fleet of the New York City Subway that has entered service since the turn of the 21st century. This includes the current R142, R142A, R143, R160, R179, R188 and R211 models, along with the planned R262 model. Two prototypes, the R110A and R110B, were used to test the features that would be found on all NTT trains today.

Sometimes referred to as New Millennium Trains, they are known for improvements in technology, energy efficiency, reliability, and comfort along with advanced passenger information systems. All of these trains are capable of operating with communications-based train control (CBTC)—which can allow for automatic train controls and compatibility with updated signal systems—and either already have CBTC or are scheduled to be retrofitted with the system. Much of the engineering and construction efforts for the fleet have been done by Kawasaki Heavy Industries and Bombardier Transportation, with Alstom also participating in the construction of the R160 fleet.

List of New Technology Trains 
This is a list of all NTT trains operated by the New York City Subway, as well as future trains and retired trains of the MTA.

Current 
 R142 – Built by Bombardier Transportation. The first production model of NTT trains. Built for the A Division. Entered service on July 10, 2000. Assigned to the 2, 4 and 5 routes. The R142s are similar to the R142As and the R188s.
 R142A – Built by Kawasaki Rail Car Company. The second model of NTT trains. Used by the A Division. Also entered service on July 10, 2000, the same day the R142s entered service. 380 cars converted into R188s. 220 cars remain unconverted, and are currently assigned to the 4. The R142As are similar to the R142s and nearly identical to the R188s.
 R143 – Built by Kawasaki Rail Car Company. The third model of NTTs and the first model of NTTs for the B Division, assigned to the L. Entered service on February 12, 2002. Equipped with CBTC, the first subway car to be equipped with this feature. The R143s are similar to the R160s and R179s.
 R160 – Built by Alstom and Kawasaki Rail Car Company. Used by the B Division. The fourth model of NTT trains. There are two subtypes since these cars were built by two different manufacturers. R160As were built by Alstom, while R160Bs were built by Kawasaki. The R160Bs entered service on August 17, 2006, while the R160As entered service on October 17, 2006. Currently, the R160s are assigned to the E, F, G, J/Z, L, M and R routes. 17 four-car sets have CBTC for the L. An additional 309 sets, configured in four and five-car sets, will be equipped with CBTC for the IND Queens Boulevard Line, which the E, F, M, and R routes run on. The R160s are similar to the R143s and R179s; however, none of them are interchangeable.
 R188 – Built by the Kawasaki Rail Car Company. The fifth model of NTT trains. The R188s entered service on December 15, 2013. They are used exclusively on the 7 route of the A Division, and thus is grouped in eleven-car trains, and are CBTC equipped. The order consists of 380 converted R142A cars and of 126 identical newly built cars. The R188s are similar to the R142s in addition to being nearly identical to the R142As.
 R179 – Built by Bombardier Transportation. The sixth model of NTT trains. Used by the B Division. The first car to be delivered, numbered 3014, arrived at 207th Street Yard on September 6, 2016. The R179s entered service on December 27, 2017. All cars were delivered by the end of December 2019. Currently, the R179s are assigned to the A, C, and J/Z routes. The R179s are similar to the R160s and R143s.
 R211 – Built by Kawasaki Rail Car Company. The seventh model of NTT trains, and the first with a redesigned appearance. Currently used by the B Division, will be used on the Staten Island Railway in the future. 20 cars are open-gangway experimental prototype cars. Will also have Wi-Fi, security cameras, digital video screens, and electronic charging stations. Currently being tested although one set is in service. The R211 introduces a new exterior and interior not present on previous NTT orders.

Future 
 R262 – Will be used by the A Division. Will be equipped with communications-based train control and ethernet systems. May include open gangways. Manufacturer is to be announced soon.

Retired 
 R110A – Contract number was R130. Built by Kawasaki Rail Car Company and used mainly on the 2 route. Was a prototype train for the A Division that operated from 1993 to 1999. Used to test out new technology features that would be incorporated into the R142 car order. Was not intended for long-term production use. All B-cars of the set were converted into pump cars between 2013 and 2014. All A-cars set to be converted in the future.
 R110B – Contract number was R131. Built by Bombardier Transportation and used mainly on the A route. Also ran on the C route for final years in service. Was a prototype train for the B Division that operated from 1993 to 2000. Designed to test various new technology features that would eventually be incorporated into the R143 car order and was also not intended for long-term production use. Five cars were sent away, while four cars remain at 207th Street Yard.

History 

The New Technology program emerged from modernization efforts by the Metropolitan Transportation Authority (MTA) beginning in 1982, when the subway "was on the verge of collapse". The New Technology program officially began in 1988, the first effort at a technologically advanced subway car since the R44 in the early 1970s. In 1989, the MTA awarded contracts for two prototype test trains: the R110A (contract R130) for the A Division built by Kawasaki Heavy Industries, and the R110B (contract R131) for the B Division built by Bombardier Transportation. The two New Technology test trains (NTTTs) began service in June 1993, testing features that would be implemented on future mass-production orders. Both trains were taken out of service by 2000, due to multiple issues with the trains.

In 1997, the first mass order of New Technology trains was placed for the R142 and R142A trains of the A Division (awarded to Bombardier and Kawasaki respectively), in order to replace the final 1,410 Redbird cars in operation. In 1998, a smaller contract of 212 cars, consisting of 100 in the base order and 112 in the optional order, was awarded to Kawasaki Heavy Industries, to build the R143 model for the B Division's BMT Eastern Division (primarily the BMT Canarsie Line's L train). The first R142s and R142As entered service beginning in July 2000. The R143s began operation in February 2002.

In July 2002, the MTA awarded contracts to Kawasaki and Alstom for the R160 order for the B Division, with options for up to 1,700 cars to replace many 1960s- and 1970s-era cars. The initial 660-car base order was filled by October 2008, with a total of 1,662 cars delivered by May 6, 2010.

On May 5, 2010, Kawasaki was awarded the contract for the R188 A Division order, to provide 46 CBTC-ready 11-car trains for the IRT Flushing Line. Unlike the other orders, the R188 constructed only 126 new subway cars, with the remaining 380 cars consisting of converted R142As. The first R188s entered service on November 9, 2013.

On June 4, 2012, Bombardier was awarded the R179 contract for 300 new B Division cars, to replace the 50 R42s on the BMT Jamaica Line. In December 2012, preliminary designs began on the R211 B Division contract, which entails 940 cars in order to expand the system fleet, and to replace the R46 fleet, and the R44 fleet of the Staten Island Railway; both models were built in the 1970s. Both the R179 and R211 orders were supposed to replace the 222 remaining R32 cars, which were built in the 1960s and have run well past their expected lives, by the year 2022., however, in January 2020, it was decided that the R179 fleet was to replace all remaining R32s.  The R179 order fell significantly behind schedule, with first test train delivered in September 2016.

On January 19, 2018, the MTA Board suggested that Kawasaki Rail Car Corp., a subsidiary of Kawasaki Heavy Industries, be awarded the $3.7 billion base order for the first 535 new R211 cars. The cars are anticipated to be delivered from 2020 to 2023, with the option orders to be delivered by 2025. The R211 base order includes 20 R211T cars with open gangways; 75 R211S cars for the Staten Island Railway, to be delivered near the end of the base order; and 440 cars similar to the R143/R160 series, operating in five-car units. The cars will be assembled at Kawasaki's factories in Lincoln, Nebraska, and Yonkers, New York. After multiple delays, the first R211A test train was delivered in July 2021, with the production cars being delivered between 2021 and 2023. The first of the R211Ts were delivered on October 31, 2022.

In January 2019, the MTA announced that the R262s would be replacing the R62 and R62A fleets, a new fleet that would be ordered as part of a future capital program.

Design and features 

The NTT models utilize a common car design; stainless-steel car bodies with a black front fascia on the "A" (cab) cars, open lexan-glass windows on non-cab ends allowing passengers to see through to the next car, and electronic outer route signs, as opposed to the rollsigns used by previous models. Improvements to the conductors' interface include the addition of speedometers as well as electronic consoles that monitor mechanical problems that may occur on the train. The cars feature a white fiberglass interior with blue-gray plastic bench seats both to combat vandalism, along with bright fluorescent lighting and LED interior passenger information signs. The bench-style seats, designed with lumbar supports, also replaced the bucket-style seats used on rolling stock built in the 1970s and '80s, which were uncomfortable for some passengers and harder to clean. The trains utilize an airbag suspension (replacing conventional springs) for a more comfortable ride, and employ regenerative braking which converts the energy from brake application into electricity that is fed back into the third rail.

All NTT trains are capable of being equipped with communications-based train control (CBTC) technology, which is installed in the "A" cars behind the train operator's cab. Many, if not all of the remaining R160s will also be retrofitted with CBTC, as well as all existing cars in the R142 and R142A fleets and future cars in the R211 and R262 fleets.

Recorded announcements 
The NTTs are the first rolling stock in the system to utilize pre-recorded train announcements, as opposed to live announcements from conductors. The recorded announcements are used for station information, closing doors, and other general messages. Station announcements rely on a wheel-rotation counter to make accurate stop announcements. The recordings began in the late 1990s and feature Bloomberg Radio on-air speakers, who volunteered at the request of their employer Michael Bloomberg, who would later become mayor of New York City. Voices include Dianne Thompson (for the 1, 2, and 3 (and the discontinued 9) trains), Melissa Kleiner (original voice of the 4 and 5 trains outside of Manhattan), Jessica Ettinger Gottesman (current voice for the 4, 5, and 6 trains), Annie Bergen (for the 7 train and 42nd Street Shuttle), Catherine Cowdery (for the B, D, E, G, J, L, M, N, Q, R, (V discontinued), W, and Z trains), Kathleen Campion (for the A, C, and F trains, as well as the Franklin Avenue Shuttle and Rockaway Park Shuttle), and Charlie Pellett (for other announcements). Since 2018, Velina Mitchell has also done some of the announcements formerly performed by Pellett, particularly informational messages and station accessibility information.

Female voices are typically used for station, route, and transfer/connection announcements, although Pellett announces the majority of the transfers on the A Division instead of the female voices. Pellett's recordings are used for most of the remaining announcements, most notably "Stand clear of the closing doors, please" before train doors closing, but also for safety announcements such as "Please be careful of the gap between the platform and the train" before entering a station with curved platforms, and "If you see something, say something." With regard to why certain messages are voiced by males and others by females, MTA spokesperson Gene Sansone said in 2006, "Most of the orders are given by a male voice, while informational messages come from females. Even though this happened by accident, it is a lucky thing because a lot of psychologists agree that people are more receptive to orders from men and information from women." Manual announcements can still be made over the public address system by train operators and conductors.

In January 2020, as part of an agreement between the MTA and Comedy Central to promote actress Awkwafina's TV show Nora From Queens, the default pre-recorded announcements for the 7 train on the R188s were replaced with those from Awkwafina for one week. The announcements from Awkwafina featured jokes in addition to the standard station announcements. The agreement was the first time that the MTA has replaced train announcements as a form of advertising.

Electronic strip maps 

The R142s, R142As, R143s, and R188s feature electronic "strip maps." These maps utilize a total of 63 amber LED lights, numbered 001–063, to display stops, with a plastic card on top showing the route, stations, and transfers. A light will flash when a stop is being approached, and while idle at that stop. Lights turned off to indicate a stop already reached, or a part of the route not serviced on that particular trip. LED arrows at either end of the map indicate the direction of service.

Electronic strip maps were first tested on the R110A and R110B in the 1990s. While an upgrade from static route maps, most of the strip maps can only facilitate one service and must be turned off when a train is used on another route. This problem is common on the 2 and 5 trains, which both use R142 cars based from the East 180th Street and 239th Street yards and have large amounts of route overlap on the IRT White Plains Road, Eastern Parkway, and Nostrand Avenue lines. The problem is also seen occasionally on the J/Z and L trains, which use R143 cars from the East New York yard that is shared by all three services. To solve this problem, the MTA began replacing the individual strip maps for cars assigned to these routes in 2016, with combined strip maps showing both services; the R143s would later be retrofitted with strip maps that also show all stops used by all three services beginning in late 2019.

Digital displays 

The R160s, R179s, and R211s employ digital display systems as an advanced alternative to strip maps. These systems update the stations at every stop, also giving the number of stops to each station listed. As the displays can be used by multiple routes instead of one, this allows for instant route or line changes with the correct information, which includes, but is not limited to, omitting certain stops (displayed as "Will not stop" in red).

The R160s and R179s employ a system called the "Flexible Information and Notice Display," or "FIND." There are three of these in every car. This includes an LCD screen displaying the route, route information, and advertisements, as well as a dynamic red, yellow, and green LED strip map that displays the next ten stations, plus five consecutive "further stops" to riders. Although they function the same on both models, the FIND systems used on the R179s are slightly different from those used on the R160s. The LCD displays where the route's emblem is displayed are slightly larger than those on the R160s. If the FIND has gone blank, the R179 FIND displays "Route change: this map is not in use", as opposed to the R160 FIND, which displays "Listen to train crew for announcement."

The R211 introduces a new digital display system, known as the "Flexible Ceiling Strip Display." There are now eight of these in each car, located above each set of doors. Similar the FIND system, an LCD strip map displays the next ten stations, plus consecutive "further stops". The route and route information are also displayed on the left of the map. Unlike the R160s and R179s, the screens of the R211s have the ability to display additional information when arriving at a station, such as specific bus transfers, elevator locations, and which car the customer is located in. However, this feature was not shown to be operational during the first few days of passenger service, but may become operational in the near future. In addition to various screens throughout the train, touch screen displays are present throughout the R211 cars, allowing people to zoom in and out of the map.

Incidents 
On April 18, 2004, an eight-car R143 train overshot the bumper at Eighth Avenue after the operator suffered a possible seizure. The lead car, 8196, presumably suffered damage while the rest of the consist did not. By 2007, the set had been repaired and returned to service.

On June 21, 2006, an eight-car R143 train overshot the bumper at the end of the tracks in the Canarsie Yard. Leading car 8277 suffered significant damage and was stripped of damaged parts before being sent to the Kawasaki plant in Yonkers to receive repairs. The other cars in the set suffered minor body damage and were moved to the 207th Street Yard and repaired. By 2016, car 8277 was finally recoupled with 8278-8280.

After Hurricane Sandy, R160B set 8738–8742 was damaged and required an extensive electrical reconstruction at Coney Island Shops. In March 2016, the set underwent pre-service testing and finally returned to service in fall 2016.

On March 27, 2020, a northbound 2 train with R142 consists 6346-6350 and 6366-6370 caught fire while traveling from 96th Street to Central Park North–110th Street, killing the operator and injuring 16 others. The fire erupted on board car 6347, damaging that car, as well as causing additional fire and smoke damage to the rest of the set, which has been taken out of service.

In the aftermath of Hurricane Ida, R160B set 9108-9112 was damaged and towed to Coney Island Overhaul Shop to be repaired.

Since the delivery of the R179s, multiple issues have resulted in their temporary removal from service for investigations and repairs. By the start of December 2018, some R179s had to be taken out of service due to manufacturing defects such as doors, propulsion, and air compressors issues. In early January 2019, NYCTA President Andy Byford ordered more newer R179 cars to be removed from passenger service and the temporary suspension of the delivery of further cars until Bombardier corrected all defects found within them. Deliveries recommenced in February 2019. On May 10, 2019, it was found that there is a welding defect on the collision pillars of the R179, but not all trains on property at the time were pulled from service. Between January 8 and January 24, 2020, all cars in revenue were taken out of passenger service due to raised concerns that train doors could malfunction while the trains were in service, and that doors could potentially open up when the train was in motion, all taking place on the C train.
 Most recently, the fleet was sidelined between June 3, 2020 and September 23, 2020 after a set of R179s on the A train had its link bar break in service at Chambers Street station, causing the consist to be split into two. The entire fleet was subsequently pulled from service and underwent thorough safety investigations to address any in-service issues that do occur.

Notes

References

External links 
 nycsubway.org: R-110 New Technology Test Program
 nycsubway.org: New Technology Trains - A Division
 nycsubway.org: New Technology Trains - B Division

New York City Subway rolling stock